Carlos Berlocq was the defending champion but decided not to participate.
Horacio Zeballos won the title, defeating Julian Reister 6–3, 6–2 in the final.

Seeds

Draw

Finals

Top half

Bottom half

References
 Main Draw
 Qualifying Draw

2012 ATP Challenger Tour
2012 Singles
2012 in Uruguayan tennis